Viorica Dumitru (born 4 August 1946) is a retired Romanian sprint canoer. She competed at the 1968 and 1972 Olympics and 1973 and 1974 world championships and won one silver and five bronze medals in various events. She also placed fourth in the K-2 500 m final at the 1968 Olympics, 0.57 seconds behind the second and third places.

References

External links

1946 births
Canoeists at the 1968 Summer Olympics
Canoeists at the 1972 Summer Olympics
Living people
Olympic canoeists of Romania
Olympic bronze medalists for Romania
Romanian female canoeists
Olympic medalists in canoeing
ICF Canoe Sprint World Championships medalists in kayak
Medalists at the 1972 Summer Olympics
Medalists at the 1968 Summer Olympics
20th-century Romanian women